Medicine is an open access peer-reviewed medical journal published by Lippincott Williams & Wilkins, an imprint of Wolters Kluwer. It was established in 1922. Of general medical journals still in publication since 1959, Medicine had the highest number of citations per paper between 1959 and 2009. The journal covers all aspects of clinical medicine and publishes in over 43 specialty subjects.

Medicine is now a fully open access mega journal publication, providing authors with a distinctive new service offering continuous publication of original research across a broad spectrum of medical scientific disciplines and sub–specialties. Medicine covers the latest research and clinical developments in medicine and health sciences.

Abstracting and indexing 
The journal is abstracted and indexed in:

References

External links 
 

English-language journals
Wolters Kluwer academic journals
General medical journals
Publications established in 1922